Montana  is a state in the Western United States. The western third of Montana contains numerous mountain ranges. Smaller, "island ranges" are found in the central third of the state, for a total of 77 named ranges of the Rocky Mountains. This geographical fact is reflected in the state's name, derived from the Spanish word  (mountain). Montana has several nicknames, including: "The Treasure State" and "Big Sky Country", and slogans that include "Land of the Shining Mountains" and more recently, "The Last Best Place".  The state ranks fourth in area, but 44th in population, and accordingly has the third-lowest population density in the United States. The economy is primarily based on services, with ranching, wheat farming, oil and coal mining in the east, and lumber, tourism, and hard rock mining in the west. Millions of tourists annually visit Glacier National Park, the Little Bighorn Battlefield National Monument, and three of the five entrances to Yellowstone National Park.

Academics

Artists

Photographers

Athletes 

Montanans participate in a wide variety of sports including: baseball, basketball, boxing, cycling, football, golf, rodeo, figure skating, skiing, and wrestling.

Authors

Business figures

Architects

Entrepreneurs

Clergy

Entertainment and performing arts 

Montanans participate in many aspects of the entertainment and performing arts fields including: acting, animation, directing, and music.

Journalists 
Journalists collect and disseminate information about current events, people, trends, and issues. Their work is acknowledged as journalism. The following individuals are prominent journalists from Montana.

Military 
Prior to statehood in 1889, the U. S. Army played a key role in facilitating settlement via actions against Native Americans, exploration and surveying. During World War I over 40,000 Montanans served in the armed forces, 25% more than any other state on a per-capita basis. Over 1,500 Montanans died in World War I. World War II brought air bases to Montana with the establishment of Malmstrom AFB, Montana in 1941 outside Great Falls, Montana. The Cold War saw the plains of eastern Montana become Minuteman Missile fields. The following individuals were prominent members of the United States armed forces and/or participated in significant military events in Montana.

Medal of Honor recipients

Montana territorial period

State of Montana

Pioneers (pre–1900) 
Prior to 1850, Montana was unsettled territory. Much of the state was part of a much larger Dakota Territory in 1863 and the westernmost portion of the state became part of the Oregon Territory in 1848. The territory was the realm of fur traders and Native Americans. The first European settlements were Christian missions in the western part of the state (1821). A fur trading settlement at Fort Benton on the Missouri River was established in 1847. In the 1850s, pioneers traveling along the Mormon and Oregon Trails started moving north into the Beaverhead River country establishing Montana's first cattle ranches. Gold was first discovered in Montana at Gold Creek near present day Garrison, Montana in 1852. Major gold strikes were made at Alder Gulch, Montana in 1864 spawning present day Virginia City, Montana and Bannack, Montana, the first territorial capital. In 1883 the Northern Pacific Railway completed its transcontinental route across Montana followed by the Great Northern Railway in 1893. From the first gold strikes to the beginning of the 20th century, pioneers flowed into Montana to establish mines, cattle ranches, lumber mills, banks, mercantiles, tourism, Yellowstone National Park and farms across the state. The following individuals played a prominent role in this pioneer period of Montana history.

Politicians 

Montana became a territory on May 26, 1864. The territorial government was first formed at the first territorial capital Bannack. Later the territorial capital was moved to Virginia City (1865), and Helena (1875). On November 8, 1889, Montana became a state and Helena remained the capital. During the territorial period, most senior government positions were appointed by the U.S. President. Once Montana became a state, elections were held for state and federal offices. The U.S. President still appointed judges to the federal courts in Montana. Prominent Montana politicians include the longest serving Senate Majority Leader, Senator Mike Mansfield and first woman Congresswoman, Jeannette Rankin.

Judges

Political leaders and activists

State legislators 

The Montana State Legislature is the state legislature of the U.S. state of Montana. It is composed of the 100-member Montana House of Representatives and the 50-member Montana Senate.

Recreationalists 

Recreation is an activity of leisure, leisure being discretionary time. The "need to do something for recreation" is an essential element of human biology and psychology. Recreational activities are often done for enjoyment, amusement, or pleasure and are considered to be "fun". Since the late 1800s, Montana has been a mecca for fly fishing, hunting, hiking, climbing and other recreations. The following individuals are prominent in the recreational history of Montana.

Scientists

Others 

Dustin Lind, director of hitting and assistant hitting coach for the San Francisco Giants

Infamous Montanans

Fictional Montanans

See also 

 List of Montana suffragists
Lists of Americans

References

External links 
 Montana's Tourism's List of Famous Montanans
 Sports Illustrated's 1999 list of The 50 Greatest Montana Sports Figures of the 20th century
 Montana Historical Society's list of famous Montanans
 e-Referencedesk list of famous Montanans
 ThingsToDo list of famous Montanans